Angela Davis Johnson is an American painter, mixed-media artist, and ritual performance artist. She currently lives Atlanta, Georgia. She is the mother of two children.

Her work revolves around the evolving identity of African Americans throughout history, especially African-American women. Davis Johnson's work has shown in numerous exhibitions including the Delta Exhibition at Arkansas Arts Center in Little Rock, Arkansas, Texarkana Regional Arts Center in Texarkana, Texas, and Baton Rouge Center for Contemporary Art in Baton Rouge, Louisiana. Her pieces can be seen in galleries and private collections throughout the United States.

Early life 
Angela Davis Johnson was born in Orlando, Florida. She and her family later moved to Virginia, where she attended Governor's School for the Arts, an art magnet school in Norfolk, Virginia. Davis Johnson's interest in art began at a young age. She was first inspired to create art by her mother, who had returned to school for fashion design when Angela was 4 and would share what she had learned with Angela and her siblings. When Angela was 14, she, along with her mother and three siblings, were evicted from their home in Norfolk and moved to Lambrook, Arkansas. Despite being impoverished, her mother encouraged Angela and her siblings to embrace and explore their creativity through singing songs, reading, and whittling, and would purchase art supplies.

Style 
A self-taught artist, Davis Johnson explores "universal connections, identity and historical occurrences through personal symbols" in her work. Davis Johnson's work addresses several issues facing black women including trauma, domestic violence, poverty, gentrification, state-sanctioned violence, the silencing of black women, and displacement.

When asked what she hoped people will take away from her body of work, she responded:I want people to feel the complexity of the embodied experience of black womanhood. I want people to feel that when they see my work. We’re not just superheroes. We are all things. We are souls living this life. I want people to experience that in my work, feel the depths of that. I want people to recognize and feel their soul. See the thing beyond the construct, which is light, you know. To me it’s like the past, present and future. It’s all happening right now in this moment. I want people to feel that when they come by my work, when they’re away from it. I want people to witness all of that in all of our [black women artists'] works. She incorporates scraps of paper and fabric into many of her oil paintings, as an homage to her seamstress mother and in an effort to introduce humble materials into fine arts spaces.

Current Projects 
Davis Johnson is a new Artist-in-Residence at Fountainhead, a Miami, Florida arts organization. Her residency begins in June 2022 along with two other artists, Natalie Ball and Shizu Saldamando, and is titled "Time for You: BIPOC Mothers".

Personal life
Davis Johnson is a single mother of two children.

Selected work

Solo exhibitions 
 2018 Magenta Portraits, Bradbury Art Museum, Jonesboro, AR
 2018 Blu Blak: Angela Davis Johnson rendering and hollerin sketches, or Blue Hole Scraps from the Archives, MINT Gallery, Atlanta, GA
 2017 Ritual || Reasoning + Codes, The Butler Center, Little Rock, AR
 2016 Wondrous Possibilities of Falling and Flying, THEA Foundation, North Little Rock, AR
 2015 Ashes on the Fruit Trees, Argenta Art Gallery, North Little Rock, AR
 2015 black. lace arrangements, University of Fayetteville, Fayetteville, AR
 2014 Array of Humanity, Art Connection, Little Rock, AR
 2014 Grace Beneath the Floating World, Texarkana Regional Arts Center Texarkana, TX
 2013 Kinfolk and the Apothecary Dream, Gallery 360, Little Rock, AR
 2013 Down Home Musings, Donaghey Plaza Gallery, Little Rock, AR

Selected group exhibitions and collaborations 
 2019 National Black Arts Festival, Atlanta, GA
2018 Identity at Arms Length, Still Point, Atlanta, GA
 2018 O Freedom, My Beloved, Zucot Gallery, Atlanta, GA
 2018 Ain’t I a Woman, TILA Studios, Atlanta, GA
 2018 MINT Leap Year Retrospective, Atlanta, GA
 2017 Headspace, The Healthcare Gallery, Baton Rouge, LA
 2017 The Gathering, WonderRoot, Atlanta, GA
 2017 A Sense of Place, Fayetteville Underground, Fayetteville, AR
 2016 The Hollerin Space, Mississippi Museum of Art, Jackson, MS
 2015 The Hollerin Quiet, ROOTS Week, Arden, NC
 2015 Vox Femina, Arts Center of the Ozarks, Siloam Springs, AR
 2014 Bombay Sapphire Artisan Series, Mason Murer Gallery, Atlanta, GA
 2014 56th Annual Delta Exhibition, Arkansas Arts Center, Little Rock, AR
 2013 Texarkana Regional Arts & Humanities 25th Annual Show Texarkana, TX
 2013 Arkansas League of Artist Members Show Cox Creative Center, Little Rock, AR
 2013 Delta Artists Show Tunica River Park Museum, Tunica, MS
 2013 People & Places, Ellen Hobgood Gallery, Heber Springs, AR
 2012 ALA Annual Art Show, Butler Center Little Rock
 2012 Small Works on Paper, Arkansas Art Council Traveling Exhibition
 2011 Venus Envy, Baton Rouge Center for Contemporary Art, Baton Rouge, LA

Permanent collections 
 Mosaic Templars Cultural Center, Little Rock, AR
 Central Arkansas Library System, McMath Library Branch Little Rock, AR
 Brooks Co., Wabash, AR

References

External links 
 Angela Davis Johnson website
 Angela Davis Johnson Instagram page

Year of birth missing (living people)
Living people
American women painters
Mixed-media artists
American women performance artists
American performance artists
African-American women artists
African-American painters
People from Orlando, Florida
Artists from Florida
Artists from Virginia
21st-century American painters
21st-century American women artists
Self-taught artists
African-American women musicians
21st-century African-American women
21st-century African-American artists